The Boeing B-52 Stratofortress is an American long-range, subsonic, jet-powered strategic bomber. The B-52 was designed and built by Boeing, which has continued to provide support and upgrades. It has been operated by the United States Air Force (USAF) since the 1950s.

Beginning with the successful contract bid in June 1946, the B-52 design evolved from a straight wing aircraft powered by six turboprop engines to the final prototype YB-52 with eight turbojet engines and swept wings. The B-52 took its maiden flight in April 1952. Built to carry nuclear weapons for Cold Warera deterrence missions, the B-52 Stratofortress replaced the Convair B-36 Peacemaker. A veteran of several wars, the B-52 has dropped only conventional munitions in combat. The B-52's official name Stratofortress is rarely used; informally, the aircraft has become commonly referred to as the BUFF (Big Ugly Fat Fucker/Fella).

The B-52 has been in service with the USAF since 1955. , there are 76 aircraft in inventory; 58 operated by active forces (2nd Bomb Wing and 5th Bomb Wing), 18 by reserve forces (307th Bomb Wing), and about 12 in long-term storage at the Davis-Monthan AFB Boneyard. The bombers flew under the Strategic Air Command (SAC) until it was disestablished in 1992 and its aircraft absorbed into the Air Combat Command (ACC); in 2010, all B-52 Stratofortresses were transferred from the ACC to the new Air Force Global Strike Command (AFGSC). Superior performance at high subsonic speeds and relatively low operating costs have kept them in service despite the advent of later, more advanced strategic bombers, including the Mach 2+ Convair B-58 Hustler, the canceled Mach 3 North American XB-70 Valkyrie, the variable-geometry Rockwell B-1 Lancer, and the stealth Northrop Grumman B-2 Spirit. The B-52 completed 60 years of continuous service with its original operator in 2015. After being upgraded between 2013 and 2015, the last airplanes are expected to serve into the 2050s.

Development

Origins

On 23 November 1945, Air Materiel Command (AMC) issued desired performance characteristics for a new strategic bomber "capable of carrying out the strategic mission without dependence upon advanced and intermediate bases controlled by other countries". The aircraft was to have a crew of five or more turret gunners, and a six-man relief crew. On 13 February 1946, the USAF issued bid invitations for these specifications, with Boeing, Consolidated Aircraft, and Glenn L. Martin Company submitting proposals.

On 28 June 1946, Boeing was issued a letter of contract for million to build a full-scale mockup of the new XB-52 and do preliminary engineering and testing. However, by October 1946, the USAF began to express concern about the sheer size of the new aircraft and its inability to meet the specified design requirements. In response, Boeing produced the Model 464, a smaller four-engine version with a  gross weight, which was briefly deemed acceptable.

Boeing responded with two models powered by T35 turboprops. The Model 464-16 was a "nuclear only" bomber with a  payload, while the Model 464-17 was a general purpose bomber with a  payload. Due to the cost associated with purchasing two specialized aircraft, the USAF selected Model 464–17 with the understanding that it could be adapted for nuclear strikes.

In June 1947, the military requirements were updated and the Model 464-17 met all of them except for the range. It was becoming obvious to the USAF that, even with the updated performance, the XB-52 would be obsolete by the time it entered production and would offer little improvement over the Convair B-36 Peacemaker; as a result, the entire project was postponed for six months. In September 1947, the Heavy Bombardment Committee was convened to ascertain performance requirements for a nuclear bomber.

The outright cancellation of the Boeing contract on 11 December 1947 was staved off by a plea from its president William McPherson Allen to the Secretary of the Air Force Stuart Symington. Allen reasoned that the design was capable of being adapted to new aviation technology and more stringent requirements. In January 1948, Boeing was instructed to thoroughly explore recent technological innovations, including aerial refueling and the flying wing. Noting stability and control problems Northrop Corporation was experiencing with their YB-35 and YB-49 flying wing bombers, Boeing insisted on a conventional aircraft, and in April 1948 presented a million (US$ today) proposal for design, construction, and testing of two Model 464-35 prototypes.

Design effort

In May 1948, Air Materiel Command asked Boeing to incorporate the previously discarded jet engine, with improvements in fuel efficiency, into the design. That resulted in the development of yet another revisionin July 1948, Model 464-40 substituted Westinghouse J40 turbojets for the turboprops. The USAF project officer who reviewed the Model 464-40 was favorably impressed, especially since he had already been thinking along similar lines. Nevertheless, the government was concerned about the high fuel consumption rate of the jet engines of the day and directed Boeing to still use the turboprop-powered Model 464-35 as the basis for the XB-52. Although he agreed that turbojet propulsion was the future, General Howard A. Craig, Deputy Chief of Staff for Materiel, was not very enthusiastic about a jet-powered B-52 since he felt that the jet engine had not yet progressed sufficiently to permit skipping an intermediate turboprop stage. However, Boeing was encouraged to continue turbojet studies even without any expected commitment to jet propulsion.

On Thursday, 21 October 1948, Boeing engineers George S. Schairer, Art Carlsen, and Vaughn Blumenthal presented the design of a four-engine turboprop bomber to the chief of bomber development, Colonel Pete Warden. Warden was disappointed by the projected aircraft and asked if the Boeing team could produce a proposal for a four-engine turbojet bomber. Joined by Ed Wells, Boeing's vice president of engineering, the engineers worked that night in The Hotel Van Cleve in Dayton, Ohio, redesigning Boeing's proposal as a four-engine turbojet bomber. On Friday, Colonel Warden looked over the information and asked for a better design. Returning to the hotel, the Boeing team was joined by Bob Withington and Maynard Pennell, two top Boeing engineers who were in town on other business.

By late Friday night, they had laid out what was an essentially new airplane. The new design (464-49) built upon the basic layout of the B-47 Stratojet with 35-degree swept wings, eight engines paired in four underwings pods, and bicycle landing gear with wingtip outrigger wheels. A notable feature of the landing gear was the ability to pivot both fore and aft main landing gear up to 20° from the aircraft centerline to increase safety during crosswind landings (allowing the aircraft to "crab" or roll with a sideways slip angle down the runway). After a trip to a hobby shop for supplies, Schairer set to work building a model. The rest of the team focused on weight and performance data. Wells, who was also a skilled artist, completed the aircraft drawings. On Sunday, a stenographer was hired to type a clean copy of the proposal. On Monday, Schairer presented Colonel Warden with a neatly bound 33-page proposal and a  scale model. The aircraft was projected to exceed all design specifications.

Although the full-size mock-up inspection in April 1949 was generally favorable, range again became a concern since the J40s and early model J57s had excessive fuel consumption. Despite talk of another revision of specifications or even a full design competition among aircraft manufacturers, General LeMay, now in charge of Strategic Air Command, insisted that performance should not be compromised due to delays in engine development. In a final attempt to increase range, Boeing created the larger 464–67, stating that once in production, the range could be further increased in subsequent modifications. Following several direct interventions by LeMay, Boeing was awarded a production contract for thirteen B-52As and seventeen detachable reconnaissance pods on 14 February 1951. The last major design change—also at General LeMay's insistence—was a switch from the B-47 style tandem seating to a more conventional side-by-side cockpit, which increased the effectiveness of the copilot and reduced crew fatigue. Both XB-52 prototypes featured the original tandem seating arrangement with a framed bubble-type canopy (see above images).

Tex Johnston noted, "The B-52, like the B-47, utilized a flexible wing. I saw the wingtip of the B-52 static test airplane travel , from the negative 1-G load position to the positive 4-G load position."  The flexible structure allowed "...the wing to flex during gust and maneuvering loads, thus relieving high-stress areas and providing a smoother ride."  During a 3.5-G pullup, "The wingtips appeared about 35 degrees above level flight position."

Pre-production and production

During ground testing on 29 November 1951, the XB-52's pneumatic system failed during a full-pressure test; the resulting explosion severely damaged the trailing edge of the wing, necessitating considerable repairs. The YB-52, the second XB-52 modified with more operational equipment, first flew on 15 April 1952 with "Tex" Johnston as the pilot. A 2-hour, 21-minute proving flight from Boeing Field, King County, in Seattle, Washington, to Larson Air Force Base was undertaken with Boeing test pilot Johnston and USAF Lieutenant Colonel Guy M. Townsend. The XB-52 followed on 2 October 1952. The thorough development, including 670 days in the wind tunnel and 130 days of aerodynamic and aeroelastic testing, paid off with smooth flight testing. Encouraged, the USAF increased its order to 282 B-52s.

Only three of the 13 B-52As ordered were built. All were returned to Boeing and used in their test program. On 9 June 1952, the February 1951 contract was updated to order the aircraft under new specifications. The final 10, the first aircraft to enter active service, were completed as B-52Bs. At the roll-out ceremony on 18 March 1954, Air Force Chief of Staff General Nathan Twining said:

The B-52B was followed by progressively improved bomber and reconnaissance variants, culminating in the B-52G and turbofan B-52H. To allow rapid delivery, production lines were set up both at its main Seattle factory and at Boeing's Wichita facility. More than 5,000 companies were involved in the huge production effort, with 41% of the airframe being built by subcontractors. The prototypes and all B-52A, B and C models (90 aircraft) were built at Seattle. Testing of aircraft built in Seattle caused problems due to jet noise, which led to the establishment of curfews for engine tests.

As production of the B-47 came to an end, the Wichita factory was phased in for B-52D production, with Seattle responsible for 101 D-models and Wichita 69. Both plants continued to build the B-52E, with 42 built at Seattle and 58 at Wichita, and the B-52F (44 from Seattle and 45 from Wichita). For the B-52G, Boeing decided in 1957 to transfer all production to Wichita, which freed up Seattle for other tasks, in particular, the production of airliners. Production ended in 1962 with the B-52H, with 742 aircraft built, plus the original two prototypes.

Upgrades  
A proposed variant of the B-52H was the EB-52H, which would have consisted of 16 modified and augmented B-52H airframes with additional electronic jamming capabilities. This variant would have restored USAF airborne jamming capability that it lost on retiring the EF-111 Raven. The program was canceled in 2005 following the removal of funds for the stand-off jammer. The program was revived in 2007 and cut again in early 2009.

In July 2013, the USAF began a fleet-wide technological upgrade of its B-52 bombers called Combat Network Communications Technology (CONECT) to modernize electronics, communications technology, computing, and avionics on the flight deck. CONECT upgrades include software and hardware such as new computer servers, modems, radios, data-links, receivers, and digital workstations for the crew. One update is the AN/ARC-210 Warrior beyond-line-of-sight software programmable radio able to transmit voice, data, and information in-flight between B-52s and ground command and control centers, allowing the transmission and reception of data with updated intelligence, mapping, and targeting information; previous in-flight target changes required copying down coordinates. The ARC-210 allows machine-to-machine transfer of data, useful on long-endurance missions where targets may have moved before the arrival of the B-52. The aircraft will be able to receive information through Link-16. CONECT upgrades will cost billion overall and take several years. Funding has been secured for 30 B-52s; the USAF hopes for 10 CONECT upgrades per year, but the rate has yet to be decided.

Weapons upgrades include the 1760 Internal Weapons Bay Upgrade (IWBU), which gives a 66 percent increase in weapons payload using a digital interface (MIL-STD-1760) and rotary launcher. IWBU is expected to cost roughly million. The 1760 IWBU will allow the B-52 to carry eight JDAM  bombs, AGM-158B JASSM-ER cruise missile and the ADM-160C MALD-J decoy missiles internally. All 1760 IWBUs should be operational by October 2017. Two bombers will have the ability to carry 40 weapons in place of the 36 that three B-52s can carry. The 1760 IWBU allows precision-guided missiles or bombs to be deployed from inside the weapons bay; the previous aircraft carried these munitions externally on the wing hardpoints. This increases the number of guided weapons (Joint Direct Attack Munition or JDAM) a B-52 can carry and reduces the need for guided bombs to be carried on the wings. The first phase will allow a B-52 to carry twenty-four GBU-38 500-pound guided bombs or twenty GBU-31 2,000-pound bombs, with later phases accommodating the JASSM and MALD family of missiles. In addition to carrying more smart bombs, moving them internally from the wings reduces drag and achieves a 15 percent reduction in fuel consumption.

The US Air Force Research Lab is investigating defensive laser weapons for the B-52.

The B-52 is due to receive a range of upgrades alongside a planned engine retrofit. These upgrades aim to modernize the sensors and displays of the B-52. They include the new APG-79B4 Active electronically scanned array radar, replacing older mechanically scanned arrays, the streamlining of the nose and deletion of blisters housing the forward-looking infrared/electro-optical viewing system. In October 2022 Boeing released new images of what the upgrade would look like. The upgrades will also include improved communication systems, new pylons, new cockpit displays and the deletion of one crew station. The changes will likely be enough to warrant changing the designation of the B-52H to B-52J or B-52K.

Design

Overview
The B-52 shared many technological similarities with the preceding B-47 Stratojet strategic bomber. The two aircraft used the same basic design, such as swept wings and podded jet engines, and the cabin included the crew ejection systems. On the B-52D, the pilots and electronic countermeasures (ECM) operator ejected upwards, while the lower deck crew ejected downwards; until the B-52G, the gunner had to jettison the tail gun to bail out. The tail gunner in early model B-52s was located in the traditional location in the tail of the plane, with both visual and radar gun laying systems; in later models, the gunner was moved to the front of the fuselage, with gun laying carried out by radar alone, much like the B-58 Hustler's tail gun system.

Structural fatigue was accelerated by at least a factor of eight in a low-altitude flight profile over that of high-altitude flying, requiring costly repairs to extend service life. In the early 1960s, the three-phase High Stress program was launched to counter structural fatigue, enrolling aircraft at 2,000 flying hours. Follow-up programs were conducted, such as a 2,000-hour service life extension to select airframes in 1966–1968, and the extensive Pacer Plank reskinning, completed in 1977. The wet wing introduced on G and H models was even more susceptible to fatigue, experiencing 60% more stress during a flight than the old wing. The wings were modified by 1964 under ECP 1050. This was followed by a fuselage skin and longeron replacement (ECP 1185) in 1966, and the B-52 Stability Augmentation and Flight Control program (ECP 1195) in 1967. Fuel leaks due to deteriorating Marman clamps continued to plague all variants of the B-52. To this end, all aircraft variants were subjected to Blue Band (1957), Hard Shell (1958), and finally QuickClip (1958) programs. The latter fitted safety straps that prevented catastrophic loss of fuel in case of clamp failure.

In September 2006, the B-52 became one of the first US military aircraft to fly using alternative fuel. It took off from Edwards Air Force Base with a 50/50 blend of Fischer–Tropsch process (FT) synthetic fuel and conventional JP-8 jet fuel, which burned in two of the eight engines. On 15 December 2006, a B-52 took off from Edwards with the synthetic fuel powering all eight engines, the first time a USAF aircraft was entirely powered by the blend. The seven-hour flight was considered a success. This program is part of the Department of Defense Assured Fuel Initiative, which aimed to reduce crude oil usage and obtain half of its aviation fuel from alternative sources by 2016. On 8 August 2007, Air Force Secretary Michael Wynne certified the B-52H as fully approved to use the FT blend.

Flight controls 
Because of the B-52's mission parameters, only modest maneuvers would be required with no need for spin recovery. The aircraft has a relatively small, narrow chord rudder, giving it limited yaw control authority. Originally an all-moving vertical stabilizer was to be used but was abandoned because of doubts about hydraulic actuator reliability. Because the aircraft has eight engines, asymmetrical thrust due to the loss of an engine in flight would be minimal and correctable with the narrow rudder. To assist with crosswind takeoffs and landings the main landing gear can be pivoted 20 degrees to either side from neutral. The crew would preset the yaw adjustable crosswind landing gear according to wind observations made on the ground.

Like the rudder, the elevator is also very narrow chord and the B-52 suffers from limited elevator control authority. For long-term pitch trim and airspeed changes the aircraft uses an stabilator (or all-moving tail) with the elevator used for small adjustments within a stabilizer setting. The stabilizer is adjustable through 13 degrees of movement (nine up, four down) and is crucial to operations during takeoff and landing due to large pitch changes induced by flap application.

B-52s prior to the G models had very small ailerons with a short span that was approximately equal to their chord. These "feeler ailerons" were used to provide feedback forces to the pilot's control yoke and to fine-tune the roll axes during delicate maneuvers such as aerial refueling. Due to twisting of the thin main wing, conventional outboard flap-type ailerons would lose authority and therefore could not be used. In other words, aileron activation would cause the wing to twist, undermining roll control. Six spoilerons on each wing are responsible for the majority of roll control. The late B-52G models eliminated the ailerons altogether and added an extra spoileron to each wing. Partly because of the lack of ailerons, the B-52G and H models were more susceptible to Dutch roll.

Avionics

Ongoing problems with avionics systems were addressed in the Jolly Well program, completed in 1964, which improved components of the AN/ASQ-38 bombing navigational computer and the terrain computer. The MADREC (Malfunction Detection and Recording) upgrade fitted to most aircraft by 1965 could detect failures in avionics and weapons computer systems and was essential in monitoring the AGM-28 Hound Dog missiles. The electronic countermeasures capability of the B-52 was expanded with Rivet Rambler (1971) and Rivet Ace (1973).

To improve operations at low altitudes, the AN/ASQ-151 Electro-Optical Viewing System (EVS), which consisted of a low light level television (LLLTV) and a forward looking infrared (FLIR) system mounted in blisters under the noses of B-52Gs and Hs between 1972 and 1976. The navigational capabilities of the B-52 were later augmented with the addition of GPS in the 1980s. The IBM AP-101, also used on the Rockwell B-1 Lancer bomber and the Space Shuttle, was the B-52's main computer.

In 2007, the LITENING targeting pod was fitted, which increased the effectiveness of the aircraft in the attack of ground targets with a variety of standoff weapons, using laser guidance, a high-resolution forward-looking infrared sensor (FLIR), and a CCD camera used to obtain target imagery. LITENING pods have been fitted to a wide variety of other US aircraft, such as the McDonnell Douglas F/A-18 Hornet, the General Dynamics F-16 Fighting Falcon and the McDonnell Douglas AV-8B Harrier II.

Armament
The ability to carry up to 20 AGM-69 SRAM nuclear missiles was added to G and H models, starting in 1971. To further improve its offensive ability, air-launched cruise missiles (ALCMs) were fitted. After testing of both the USAF-backed Boeing AGM-86 Air Launched Cruise Missile and the Navy-backed General Dynamics AGM-109 Tomahawk, the AGM-86B was selected for operation by the B-52 (and ultimately by the B-1 Lancer). A total of 194 B-52Gs and Hs were modified to carry AGM-86s, carrying 12 missiles on underwing pylons, with 82 B-52Hs further modified to carry another eight missiles on a rotary launcher fitted in the bomb bay. To conform with SALT II Treaty requirements that cruise missile-capable aircraft be readily identifiable by reconnaissance satellites, the cruise missile-armed B-52Gs were modified with a distinctive wing root fairing. As all B-52Hs were assumed modified, no visual modification of these aircraft was required. In 1990, the stealthy AGM-129 ACM cruise missile entered service; although intended to replace the AGM-86, the high cost and the Cold War's end led to only 450 being produced; unlike the AGM-86, no conventional, non-nuclear version was built. The B-52 was to have been modified to utilize Northrop Grumman's AGM-137 TSSAM weapon; however, the missile was canceled due to development costs.

Those B-52Gs not converted as cruise missile carriers underwent a series of modifications to improve conventional bombing. They were fitted with a new Integrated Conventional Stores Management System (ICSMS) and new underwing pylons that could hold larger bombs or other stores than the external pylons could. Thirty B-52Gs were further modified to carry up to 12 AGM-84 Harpoon anti-ship missiles each, while 12 B-52Gs were fitted to carry the AGM-142 Have Nap stand-off air-to-ground missile.< When the B-52G was retired in 1994, an urgent scheme was launched to restore an interim Harpoon and Have Nap capability, the four aircraft being modified to carry Harpoon and four to carry Have Nap under the Rapid Eight program.

The Conventional Enhancement Modification (CEM) program gave the B-52H a more comprehensive conventional weapons capability, adding the modified underwing weapon pylons used by conventional-armed B-52Gs, Harpoon and Have Nap, and the capability to carry new-generation weapons including the Joint Direct Attack Munition (JDAM) and Wind Corrected Munitions Dispenser guided bombs, the AGM-154 glide bomb and the AGM-158 JASSM missile. The CEM program also introduced new radios, integrated Global Positioning System into the aircraft's navigation system, and replaced the under-nose FLIR with a more modern unit. Forty-seven B-52Hs were modified under the CEM program by 1996, with 19 more by the end of 1999.

By around 2010, U.S. Strategic Command stopped assigning B61 and B83 nuclear gravity bombs to B-52, and later listed only the B-2 as tasked with delivering strategic nuclear bombs in budget requests. Nuclear gravity bombs were removed from the B-52's capabilities because it is no longer considered survivable enough to penetrate modern air defenses, instead relying on nuclear cruise missiles and focusing on expanding its conventional strike role. The 2019 "Safety Rules for U.S. Strategic Bomber Aircraft" manual subsequently confirmed the removal of B61-7 and B83-1 gravity bombs from the B-52H's approved weapons configuration.

Starting in 2016, Boeing is to upgrade the internal rotary launchers to the MIL-STD-1760 interface to enable the internal carriage of smart bombs, which previously could be carried only on the wings.

While the B-1 Lancer has a larger theoretical maximum payload of  compared to the B-52's , the bombers are rarely able to carry their full loads. The most the B-52 carries is a full load of AGM-86Bs totaling . The B-1 has the internal weapons bay space to carry more GBU-31 JDAMs and JASSMs, but the B-52 upgraded with the conventional rotary launcher can carry more of other JDAM variants.

AGM-183A Air-Launched Rapid Response (ARRW) hypersonic missile and the future Long Range Stand Off (LRSO) nuclear-armed air-launched cruise missile will join the B-52 inventory in the future.

Engines

The eight engines of the B-52 are paired in pods and suspended by four pylons beneath and forward of the wings' leading edge. The careful arrangement of the pylons also allowed them to work as wing fences and delay the onset of stall.

The water was carried in a  tank in the rear fuselage.

The B-52F and G models were powered by Pratt & Whitney J57-P-43WB turbojets, each rated at  static thrust with water injection.

Engine retrofit
In a study for the USAF in the mid-1970s, Boeing investigated replacing the engines, changing to a new wing, and other improvements to upgrade B-52G/H aircraft as an alternative to the B-1A, then in development.

In 1996, Rolls-Royce and Boeing jointly proposed fitting each B-52 with four leased Rolls-Royce RB211 engines. This would have involved replacing the eight Pratt & Whitney TF33 engines (total thrust ) with four RB211-535E4 engines (total thrust ), which would increase range and reduce fuel consumption. However, a USAF analysis in 1997 concluded that Boeing's estimated savings of billion would not be realized and that reengining would instead cost billion more than keeping the existing engines, citing significant up-front procurement and re-tooling expenditure.

The USAF's 1997 rejection of reengining was subsequently disputed in a Defense Science Board (DSB) report in 2003. The DSB urged the USAF to re-engine the aircraft without delay, saying doing so would not only create significant cost savings but reduce greenhouse gas emissions and increase aircraft range and endurance; these conclusions were in line with the conclusions of a separate Congress-funded study conducted in 2003.

On 23 April 2020, the USAF released its request for proposals for 608 commercial engines plus spares and support equipment, with the plan to award the contract in May 2021. This Commercial Engine Reengining Program (CERP) saw General Electric propose its CF34-10 and Passport turbofans, Pratt & Whitney its PW800, and Rolls-Royce its F130. On 24 September 2021, the USAF selected the Rolls-Royce F130 as the winner and announced plans to purchase 650 engines (608 direct replacements and 42 spares), for billion.

Unlike the previous re-engine proposal which also involved reducing the number of engines from eight to four, the F130 re-engine program maintains eight engines on the B-52. Although four-engine operation would be more efficient, retrofitting the airframe to operate with only four engines would involve additional changes to the aircraft's systems and control surfaces (particularly the rudder), thereby increasing the time, cost, and complexity of the project.

Costs

Operational history

Introduction
Although the B-52A was the first production variant, these aircraft were used only in testing. The first operational version was the B-52B which had been developed in parallel with the prototypes since 1951. First flying in December 1954, B-52B, AF Serial Number 52-8711, entered operational service with 93rd Heavy Bombardment Wing (93rd BW) at Castle Air Force Base, California, on 29 June 1955. The wing became operational on 12 March 1956. The training for B-52 crews consisted of five weeks of ground school and four weeks of flying, accumulating 35 to 50 hours in the air. The new B-52Bs replaced operational B-36s on a one-to-one basis.

Early operations were problematic; in addition to supply problems, there were also technical issues. Ramps and taxiways deteriorated under the aircraft's weight, the fuel system was prone to leaks and icing, and bombing and fire control computers were unreliable. The split-level cockpit presented a temperature control problem– the pilots' cockpit was heated by sunlight while the observer and the navigator on the bottom deck sat on the ice-cold floor. Thus, a comfortable temperature setting for the pilots caused the other crew members to freeze, while a comfortable temperature for the bottom crew caused the pilots to overheat. The J57 engines proved unreliable. Alternator failure caused the first fatal B-52 crash in February 1956; as a result, the fleet was briefly grounded. In July, fuel and hydraulic issues grounded the B-52s again. In response to maintenance issues, the USAF set up "Sky Speed" teams of 50 contractors at each B-52 base to perform maintenance and routine checkups, taking an average of one week per aircraft.

On 21 May 1956, a B-52B (52-13) dropped a Mk-15 nuclear bomb over the Bikini Atoll in a test code-named Cherokee. It was the first air-dropped thermonuclear weapon. This aircraft now is on display at the National Museum of Nuclear Science and History in Albuquerque, NM. From 24 to 25 November 1956, four B-52Bs of the 93rd BW and four B-52Cs of the 42nd BW flew nonstop around the perimeter of North America in Operation Quick Kick, which covered  in 31 hours, 30 minutes. SAC noted the flight time could have been reduced by 5 to 6 hours had the four inflight refuelings been done by fast jet-powered tanker aircraft rather than propeller-driven Boeing KC-97 Stratofreighters.

The B-52 set many records over the next few years. From 10 to 11 January 1962, a B-52H (60-40) set a world distance record by flying unrefueled, surpassing the prior B-52 record set two years earlier, from Kadena Air Base, Okinawa Prefecture, Japan, to Torrejón Air Base, Spain, which covered . The flight passed over Seattle, Fort Worth and the Azores.

Cold War

When the B-52 entered service, the Strategic Air Command (SAC) intended to use it to deter and counteract the vast and modernizing Soviet Union's military. As the Soviet Union increased its nuclear capabilities, destroying or "countering" the forces that would deliver nuclear strikes (bombers, missiles, etc.) became of great strategic importance. The Eisenhower administration endorsed this switch in focus; the President in 1954 expressed a preference for military targets over civilian ones, a principle reinforced in the Single Integrated Operation Plan (SIOP), a plan of action in the case of nuclear war breaking out.

Throughout the Cold War, B-52s and other US strategic bombers performed airborne alert patrols under code names such as Head Start, Chrome Dome, Hard Head, Round Robin and Giant Lance. Bombers loitered at high altitudes near the borders of the Soviet Union to provide rapid first strike or retaliation capability in case of nuclear war. These airborne patrols formed one component of the US's nuclear deterrent, which would act to prevent the breakout of a large-scale war between the US and the Soviet Union under the concept of Mutually Assured Destruction.

Due to the late 1950s-era threat of surface-to-air missiles (SAMs) that could threaten high-altitude aircraft, seen in practice in the 1960 U-2 incident, the intended use of B-52 was changed to serve as a low-level penetration bomber during a foreseen attack upon the Soviet Union, as terrain masking provided an effective method of avoiding radar and thus the threat of the SAMs. Although never intended for the low-level role, the B-52's flexibility allowed it to outlast several intended successors as the nature of aerial warfare changed. The B-52's large airframe enabled the addition of multiple design improvements, new equipment, and other adaptations over its service life.

In November 1959, to improve the aircraft's combat capabilities in the changing strategic environment, SAC initiated the Big Four modification program (also known as Modification 1000) for all operational B-52s except early B models. The program was completed by 1963. The four modifications were the ability to launch AGM-28 Hound Dog standoff nuclear missiles and ADM-20 Quail decoys, an advanced electronic countermeasures (ECM) suite, and upgrades to perform the all-weather, low-altitude (below 500 feet or 150 m) interdiction mission in the face of advancing Soviet missile-based air defenses.

In the 1960s, there were concerns over the fleet's capable lifespan. Several projects beyond the B-52, the Convair B-58 Hustler and North American XB-70 Valkyrie, had either been aborted or proved disappointing in light of changing requirements, which left the older B-52 as the main bomber as opposed to the planned successive aircraft models. On 19 February 1965, General Curtis E. LeMay testified to Congress that the lack of a follow-up bomber project to the B-52 raised the danger that, "The B-52 is going to fall apart on us before we can get a replacement for it." Other aircraft, such as the General Dynamics F-111 Aardvark, later complemented the B-52 in roles the aircraft was not as capable in, such as missions involving high-speed, low-level penetration dashes.

Vietnam War

With the escalating situation in Southeast Asia, 28 B-52Fs were fitted with external racks for 24 of the  bombs under project South Bay in June 1964; an additional 46 aircraft received similar modifications under project Sun Bath. In March 1965, the United States commenced Operation Rolling Thunder. The first combat mission, Operation Arc Light, was flown by B-52Fs on 18 June 1965, when 30 bombers of the 9th and 441st Bombardment Squadrons struck a communist stronghold near the Bến Cát District in South Vietnam. The first wave of bombers arrived too early at a designated rendezvous point, and while maneuvering to maintain station, two B-52s collided, which resulted in the loss of both bombers and eight crewmen. The remaining bombers, minus one more that turned back due to mechanical problems, continued towards the target. The force returned to Andersen Air Force Base except for one bomber with electrical problems that recovered to Clark Air Base, the mission having lasted 13 hours. Post-strike assessment by teams of South Vietnamese troops with American advisors found evidence that the Viet Cong had departed from the area before the raid, and it was suspected that infiltration of the south's forces may have tipped off the north because of the South Vietnamese Army troops involved in the post-strike inspection.

Beginning in late 1965, a number of B-52Ds underwent Big Belly modifications to increase bomb capacity for carpet bombings. The modification created enough capacity for a total of  using 108 bombs. Thus modified, B-52Ds could carry  more than B-52Fs. Designed to replace B-52Fs, modified B-52Ds entered combat in April 1966 flying from Andersen Air Force Base, Guam. Each bombing mission lasted 10 to 12 hours and included an aerial refueling by KC-135 Stratotankers. In spring 1967, B-52s began flying from U Tapao Airfield in Thailand so that refueling was not required.

B-52s were employed during the Battle of Ia Drang in November 1965, notable as the aircraft's first use in a tactical support role.

On 22 November 1972, a B-52D (55-110) from U-Tapao was hit by a SAM while on a raid over Vinh. The crew was forced to abandon the damaged aircraft over Thailand. This was the first B-52 destroyed by hostile fire.

The zenith of B-52 attacks in Vietnam was Operation Linebacker II (also known as the Christmas bombings), conducted from 18 to 29 December 1972, which consisted of waves of B-52s (mostly D models, but some Gs without jamming equipment and with a smaller bomb load). Over 12 days, B-52s flew 729 sorties and dropped 15,237 tons of bombs on Hanoi, Haiphong, and other targets in North Vietnam. Originally 42 B-52s were committed to the war; however, numbers were frequently twice this figure. During Operation Linebacker II, fifteen B-52s were shot down, five were heavily damaged (one crashed in Laos), and five suffered medium damage. A total of 25 crewmen were killed in these losses.

During the war, a total of 31 B-52s were lost, including ten shot down over North Vietnam.

Air-to-air combat

During the Vietnam War, B-52D tail gunners were credited with shooting down two MiG-21 "Fishbeds". On 18 December 1972 tail gunner Staff Sergeant Samuel O. Turner's B-52 had just completed a bomb run for Operation Linebacker II and was turning away when a Vietnam People's Air Force (VPAF) MiG-21 approached. The MiG and the B-52 locked onto each other. When the fighter drew within range, Turner fired his quad (four guns on one mounting) .50 (12.7 mm) caliber machine guns. The MiG exploded aft of the bomber, as confirmed by Master Sergeant Louis E. Le Blanc, the tail gunner in a nearby Stratofortress. Turner received a Silver Star for his actions. His B-52, tail number 56-676, is preserved on display with air-to-air kill markings at Fairchild Air Force Base in Spokane, Washington.

On 24 December 1972, during the same bombing campaign, the B-52 Diamond Lil was headed to bomb the Thái Nguyên railroad yards when tail gunner Airman First Class Albert E. Moore spotted a fast-approaching MiG-21. Technical Sergeant Clarence W. Chute, a tail gunner aboard another Stratofortress, watched the MiG catch fire and fall away; this was not confirmed by the VPAF. Diamond Lil is preserved on display at the United States Air Force Academy in Colorado. Moore was the last bomber gunner believed to have shot down an enemy aircraft with machine guns in aerial combat.

The two B-52 tail gunner kills were not confirmed by VPAF, and they admitted to the loss of only three MiGs, all by F-4s. Vietnamese sources have attributed a third air-to-air victory to a B-52, a MiG-21 shot down on 16 April 1972. These victories make the B-52 the largest aircraft credited with air-to-air kills. The last Arc Light mission without fighter escort took place on 15 August 1973, as U.S. military action in Southeast Asia was wound down.

Post-Vietnam War service
B-52Bs reached the end of their structural service life by the mid-1960s and all were retired by June 1966, followed by the last of the B-52Cs on 29 September 1971; except for NASA's B-52B "008" which was eventually retired in 2004 at Edwards Air Force Base, California. Another of the remaining B Models, "52-005" is on display at the Wings Over the Rockies Air and Space Museum in Denver, Colorado.

A few time-expired E models were retired in 1967 and 1968, but the bulk (82) were retired between May 1969 and March 1970. Most F models were also retired between 1967 and 1973, but 23 survived as trainers until late 1978. The fleet of D models served much longer; 80 D models were extensively overhauled under the Pacer Plank program during the mid-1970s. Skinning on the lower wing and fuselage was replaced, and various structural components were renewed. The fleet of D models stayed largely intact until late 1978 when 37 not already upgraded Ds were retired. The remainder were retired between 1982 and 1983.

The remaining G and H models were used for nuclear standby ("alert") duty as part of the United States' nuclear triad; the combination of nuclear-armed land-based missiles, submarine-based missiles, and manned bombers. The B-1, intended to supplant the B-52, replaced only the older models and the supersonic FB-111. In 1991, B-52s ceased continuous 24-hour SAC alert duty.

After Vietnam, the experience of operations in a hostile air defense environment was considered. Due to this, B-52s were modernized with new weapons, equipment, and both offensive and defensive avionics. This, and the use of low-level tactics, marked a major shift in the B-52's utility. The upgrades were:
 Supersonic short-range nuclear missiles: G and H models were modified to carry up to 20 SRAM missiles replacing existing gravity bombs. Eight SRAMs were carried internally on a special rotary launcher and 12 SRAMs were mounted on two wing pylons. With SRAM, the B-52s could strike heavily defended targets without entering the terminal defenses.
 New countermeasures: Phase VI ECM modification was the sixth major ECM program for the B-52. It improved the aircraft's self-protection capability in the dense Soviet air defense environment. The new equipment expanded signal coverage, improved threat warnings, provided new countermeasures techniques, and increased the quantity of expendables. The power requirements of Phase VI ECM also consumed most of the excess electrical capacity on the B-52G.
 B-52G and Hs were also modified with an electro-optical viewing system (EVS) that made low-level operations and terrain avoidance much easier and safer. EVS system contained a low light level television (LLTV) camera and a forward-looking infrared (FLIR) camera to display information needed for penetration at lower altitudes.
 Subsonic-cruise unarmed decoy: SCUD resembled the B-52 on the radar. As an active decoy, it carried ECM and other devices, and it had a range of several hundred miles. Although SCUD was never deployed operationally, the concept was developed, becoming known as the air-launched cruise missile (ALCM-A).

This was considered acceptable for the increase in capabilities.

After the fall of the Soviet Union, all B-52Gs remaining in service were destroyed in accordance with the terms of the Strategic Arms Reduction Treaty (START). The Aerospace Maintenance and Regeneration Center (AMRC) cut the 365 B-52s into pieces. Russia verified the completion destruction task via satellite and first-person inspection at the AMARC facility.

Gulf War and later

B-52 strikes were an important part of Operation Desert Storm. Starting on 16 January 1991, a flight of B-52Gs flew from Barksdale Air Force Base, Louisiana, refueled in the air enroute, struck targets in Iraq, and returned home a journey of 35 hours and  round trip. It set a record for the longest-distance combat mission, breaking the record previously held by an RAF Vulcan bomber in 1982; however, this was achieved using forward refueling. Those seven B-52s flew the first combat sorties of Operation Desert Storm, firing 35 AGM-86C CALCM standoff missiles and successfully destroying 85–95 percent of their targets. B-52Gs operating from the King Abdullah Air Base at Jeddah, Saudi Arabia, RAF Fairford in the United Kingdom, Morón Air Base, Spain, and the island of Diego Garcia in the British Indian Ocean Territory flew bombing missions over Iraq, initially at low altitude. After the first three nights, the B-52s moved to high-altitude missions instead, which reduced their effectiveness and psychological impact compared to the low-altitude role initially played.

The bombings demoralized the defending Iraqi troops, many of whom surrendered in the wake of the strikes. In 1999, the science and technology magazine Popular Mechanics described the B-52's role in the conflict: "The Buff's value was made clear during the Gulf War and Desert Fox. The B-52 turned out the lights in Baghdad." During Operation Desert Storm, B-52s flew about 1,620 sorties and delivered 40% of the weapons dropped by coalition forces.

During the conflict, several claims of Iraqi air-to-air successes were made, including an Iraqi pilot, Khudai Hijab, who allegedly fired a Vympel R-27R missile from his MiG-29 and damaged a B-52G on the opening night of the Gulf War. However, the USAF disputes this claim, stating the bomber was actually hit by friendly fire, an AGM-88 High-speed, Anti-Radiation Missile (HARM) that homed on the fire-control radar of the B-52's tail gun; the jet was subsequently renamed In HARM's Way. Shortly following this incident, General George Lee Butler announced that the gunner position on B-52 crews would be eliminated, and the gun turrets permanently deactivated, commencing on 1 October 1991.

Since the mid-1990s, the B-52H has been the only variant remaining in military service; it is currently stationed at:
Minot Air Force Base, North Dakota 5th Bomb Wing
Barksdale Air Force Base, Louisiana 2nd Bomb Wing (active Air Force) and 307th Bomb Wing (Air Force Reserve Command)
One B-52H is assigned to Edwards Air Force Base and is used by Air Force Materiel Command at the USAF Flight Test Center.
One additional B-52H is used by NASA at Dryden Flight Research Center, California as part of the Heavy-lift Airborne Launch program.

From 2 to 3 September 1996, two B-52Hs conducted a mission as part of Operation Desert Strike. The B-52s struck Baghdad power stations and communications facilities with 13 AGM-86C conventional air-launched cruise missiles (CALCM) during a 34-hour,  round trip mission from Andersen Air Force Base, Guam, the longest distance ever flown for a combat mission.

On 24 March 1999, when Operation Allied Force began, B-52 bombers bombarded Serb targets throughout the Federal Republic of Yugoslavia, including during the Battle of Kosare.

The B-52 contributed to Operation Enduring Freedom in 2001 (Afghanistan/Southwest Asia), providing the ability to loiter high above the battlefield and provide Close Air Support (CAS) through the use of precision-guided munitions, a mission which previously would have been restricted to fighter and ground attack aircraft. In late 2001, ten B-52s dropped a third of the bomb tonnage in Afghanistan. B-52s also played a role in Operation Iraqi Freedom, which commenced on 20 March 2003 (Iraq/Southwest Asia). On the night of 21 March 2003, B-52Hs launched at least 100 AGM-86C CALCMs at targets within Iraq.

B-52 and maritime operations
The B-52 can be highly effective for ocean surveillance and can assist the Navy in anti-ship and mine-laying operations. For example, a pair of B-52s, in two hours, can monitor  of the ocean surface. During the 2018 Baltops exercise B-52s conducted mine-laying missions off the coasts of Sweden, simulating a counter-amphibious invasion mission in the Baltic.

In the 1970s, the U.S. Navy worried that combined attacks from Soviet bombers, submarines, and warships could overwhelm its defenses and sink its aircraft carriers. After the Falklands War, US planners feared the damage that could be created by -range missiles carried by Tupolev Tu-22M "Backfire" bombers and -range missiles carried by Soviet surface ships. New US Navy's maritime strategy in the early 1980s called for the aggressive use of carriers and surface action groups against the Soviet navy. To help protect the carrier battle groups, some B-52G were modified to fire Harpoon anti-ship missiles. These bombers were based in Guam and Maine in the later 1970s to support both the Atlantic and Pacific fleets. In case of war, B-52s would coordinate with tanker support and surveillance by AWACS and Navy planes. B-52Gs could strike Soviet navy targets on the flanks of the US carrier battle groups, leaving them free to concentrate on offensive strikes against Soviet surface combatants. Mines laid down by B-52s could establish minefields in significant enemy chokepoints (mainly the Kuril Islands and the GIUK gap). These minefields would force the Soviet fleet to disperse, making individual ships more vulnerable to Harpoon attacks.

From the 1980s B-52Hs were modified to use Harpoons in addition to a wide range of cruise missiles, laser- and satellite-guided bombs, and unguided munitions. B-52 bomber crews honed sea-skimming flight profiles that would allow them to penetrate stiff enemy defenses and attack Soviet ships.

Recent expansion and modernization of the People's Liberation Army Navy of China have caused the USAF to re-implement strategies for finding and attacking ships. The B-52 fleet has been certified to use the Quickstrike family of naval mines using JDAM-ER guided wing kits. Besides this, with a view to enhancing B-52 maritime patrol and strike performance, an AN/ASQ-236 Dragon's Eye underwing pod, has also been certified for use by B-52H bombers. Dragon's Eye contains an advanced electronically scanned array radar that will allow B-52s to quickly scan vast Pacific Ocean areas, so finding and sinking enemy ships will be easier for them. This radar will complement the Litening infrared targeting pod already used by B-52s for inspecting ships. In 2019, Boeing selected the Raytheon AN/APG-82(V)1 radar to replace its mechanically scanning AN/APQ-166 attack radar.

Recent service

In August 2007, a B-52H ferrying AGM-129 ACM cruise missiles from Minot Air Force Base to Barksdale Air Force Base for dismantling was mistakenly loaded with six missiles with their nuclear warheads. The weapons did not leave USAF custody and were secured at Barksdale.

Four of 18 B-52Hs from Barksdale Air Force Base were retired and were in the "boneyard" of 309th AMARG at Davis-Monthan Air Force Base as of 8 September 2008.

In February 2015, hull 61-7 Ghost Rider became the first stored B-52 to fly out of Davis-Monthan Air Force Base after six years in storage.

In May 2019, a second aircraft was resurrected from long-term storage in Davis-Monthan. The B-52, nicknamed “Wise Guy”, had been at AMARG since 2008. It flew to Barksdale Airforce Base on May 13, 2019. It was completed in four months by a team of 13-20 maintainers from the 307th Maintenance Squadron.

B-52s are periodically refurbished at USAF maintenance depots such as Tinker Air Force Base, Oklahoma. Even while the USAF works on the new Long Range Strike Bomber, it intends to keep the B-52H in service until 2050, which is 95 years after the B-52 first entered service, an unprecedented length of service for any aircraft, civilian or military.

The USAF continues to rely on the B-52 because it remains an effective and economical heavy bomber in the absence of sophisticated air defenses, particularly in the type of missions that have been conducted since the end of the Cold War against nations with limited defensive capabilities. The B-52 has also continued in service because there has been no reliable replacement. The B-52 has the capacity to "loiter" for extended periods, and can deliver precision standoff and direct fire munitions from a distance, in addition to direct bombing. It has been a valuable asset in supporting ground operations during conflicts such as Operation Iraqi Freedom. The B-52 had the highest mission capable rate of the three types of heavy bombers operated by the USAF in the 2000–2001 period. The B-1 averaged a 53.7% ready rate, the B-2 Spirit achieved 30.3%, and the B-52 averaged 80.5%.

The Long Range Strike Bomber program is intended to yield a stealthy successor for the B-52 and B-1 that would begin service in the 2020s; it is intended to produce 80 to 100 aircraft. Two competitors, Northrop Grumman and a joint team of Boeing and Lockheed Martin, submitted proposals in 2014; Northrop Grumman was awarded a contract in October 2015.

On 12 November 2015, the B-52 began freedom of navigation operations in the South China Sea in response to Chinese man-made islands in the region. Chinese forces, claiming jurisdiction within a 12-mile exclusion zone of the islands, ordered the bombers to leave the area, but they refused, not recognizing jurisdiction. On 10 January 2016, a B-52 overflew parts of South Korea escorted by South Korean F-15Ks and U.S. F-16s in response to the supposed test of a hydrogen bomb by North Korea.

On 9 April 2016, an undisclosed number of B-52s arrived at Al Udeid Air Base in Qatar as part of Operation Inherent Resolve, part of the Military intervention against ISIL. The B-52s took over heavy bombing after B-1 Lancers that had been conducting airstrikes rotated out of the region in January 2016. In April 2016, B-52s arrived in Afghanistan to take part in the war in Afghanistan and began operations in July, proving its flexibility and precision carrying out close-air support missions.

According to a statement by the U.S. military, an undisclosed number of B-52s participated in the U.S. strikes on pro-government forces in eastern Syria on 7 February 2018.

A number of B-52s were deployed in airstrikes against the Taliban during the 2021 Taliban offensive.

In 2022, the US Air Force used a B-52 as a platform to test a Hypersonic Air-breathing Weapon Concept (HAWC) missile.

In late October 2022, ABC News reported that the USAF intended to deploy six B-52s at RAAF Tindal in Australia in the near future, which would include building provisions to handle the aircraft.

Variants

The B-52 went through several design changes and variants over its 10 years of production.

XB-52

YB-52

B-52A

NB-52A

B-52B/RB-52B

NB-52B

B-52C

RB-52C

B-52D

B-52E

JB-52E

NB-52E

B-52F

 B-52G

 B-52H

XR-16A

Operators

United States 
United States Air Force operates 72 aircraft of the original 744 B-52 aircraft were in operation with the USAF.
Air Combat Command
53d Wing – Eglin Air Force Base, Florida
49th Test and Evaluation Squadron (Barksdale)
57th Wing – Nellis Air Force Base, Nevada
340th Weapons Squadron (Barksdale)
Air Force Global Strike Command
2d Bomb Wing – Barksdale Air Force Base, Louisiana
11th Bomb Squadron
20th Bomb Squadron
96th Bomb Squadron
5th Bomb Wing – Minot Air Force Base, North Dakota
23d Bomb Squadron
69th Bomb Squadron
Air Force Materiel Command
412th Test Wing – Edwards Air Force Base, California
419th Flight Test Squadron
Air Force Reserve Command
307th Bomb Wing – Barksdale Air Force Base, Louisiana
93d Bomb Squadron
343d Bomb Squadron
 NASA
 Dryden Flight Research Center
 1 modified ex-USAF NB-52B (52-8) "Mothership" Launch Aircraft operated from 1966 to 2004. It was then put on display at the North entrance to Edwards Air Force Base.
 1 modified ex-USAF B-52H (61-25) Heavy Lift Launch Aircraft operated from 2001 to 2008. On 9 May 2008, that aircraft was flown for the last time to Sheppard Air Force Base, Texas, where it became a GB-52H maintenance trainer, never to fly again.

Notable accidents

List of incident resulting in loss of life, severe injuries, or loss of aircraft.
 In 1956, there were three crashes in eight months, all at Castle Air Force Base.
 The fourth crash occurred 42 days later on 10 January 1957 in New Brunswick, Canada.
 On 29 March 1957, B-52C (54-2676) retained by Boeing and used for tests as JB-52C, crashed during Boeing test flight from Wichita, Kansas. Two of the four crew on board were killed.
 On 11 February 1958, B-52D (56-0610) crashed short of the runway at Ellsworth AFB, South Dakota, due to total loss of power during final approach.  Two of the eight crewmembers on board were killed in addition to three ground personnel. The crash was determined to be from frozen fuel lines that clogged fuel filters. It was previously unknown that jet fuel absorbs water vapor from the atmosphere.  After this accident, over two hundred previous aircraft losses listed as "cause unknown" were attributed to frozen fuel lines.
 On 8 September 1958, two B-52Ds (56‑0661 and 56‑0681) from the 92d Bombardment Wing collided in midair near Fairchild AFB. All thirteen crew members on the two aircraft were killed.
 On 23 June 1959, B-52D (56‑0591), named "Tommy's Tigator", operating out of Larson AFB, crashed in the Ochoco National Forest near Burns, Oregon. The aircraft was operated by Boeing personnel during a test flight and crashed after turbulence-induced failure in the horizontal stabilizer at a low elevation. All five Boeing personnel were killed.
 On 15 October 1959, B-52F (57‑0036) from the 4228th Strategic Wing at Columbus AFB, Mississippi, carrying two nuclear weapons collided in midair with a KC-135 tanker (57-1513) near Hardinsburg, Kentucky during a mid-air refueling. Four of the eight crew members on the bomber and all four crew on the tanker were killed. One of the nuclear bombs was damaged by fire, but both weapons were recovered.
 On 15 December 1960, B-52D (55‑0098) from the 4170th Strategic Wing collided with a KC-135 during mid-air refueling. The refueling probe from the KC-135 pierced the skin on the wing of the B-52. Upon landing at Larson AFB, the starboard wing failed, and the aircraft caught fire during the landing roll. The runway at Larson was damaged. All crew members were evacuated. The KC-135 landed at Fairchild AFB.
 On 19 January 1961, B-52B (53‑0390), call sign "Felon 22", from the 95th Bombardment Wing out of Biggs AFB, El Paso, Texas crashed just north of Monticello, Utah after a turbulence-induced structural failure, the tail snapped off, at altitude. Only the copilot survived after ejecting. The other seven crewmen died.

 On 24 January 1961, B-52G (58‑0187) from the 4241st Strategic Wing broke up in midair and crashed on approach to Seymour Johnson AFB near Goldsboro, North Carolina, dropping two nuclear bombs in the process without detonation. The aircraft suffered a fuel leak at altitude due to fatigue failure of the starboard wing. A loss of control resulted when the flaps were applied during the emergency approach to Seymour Johnson AFB. Three of the eight crew members were killed.
Due to increased fuel consumption at the lower altitude and being unable to rendezvous with a tanker in time, the aircraft ran out of fuel.
 On 7 April 1961, B-52B (53‑0380), call sign "Ciudad Juarez", from the 95th Bombardment Wing out of Biggs AFB was accidentally shot down by the launch of a AIM-9 Sidewinder from a F-100A Super Sabre (53-1662) from the New Mexico ANG F-100A 53-1662 during practice intercept. The missile struck the engine pylon on the B-52 resulting in separation of the wing. The aircraft crashed on Mount Taylor, New Mexico with three of the eight crew on board killed. A firing circuit electrical fault caused the inadvertent launch of the missile.
 On 13 January 1964, the vertical stabilizer broke off B-52D (55‑0060), callsign "Buzz 14", causing a crashed on Savage Mountain in western Maryland. Excessive turbulence resulted in structural failure in a winter storm. The two MK53 nuclear bombs being ferried were found "relatively intact". Four of the crew of five ejected but two of them died due to exposure from the winter cold.
Both aircraft were from the same squadron (441st Bombardment Squadron) of the 7th Bombardment Wing, Carswell AFB, Texas and assigned to 3960th Strategic Wing operating out of Andersen AFB, Guam. Eight of twelve total crew members in two planes were killed. The rescue of four crew members who had managed to eject only to parachute into one of the largest typhoons of the 20th century remains one of the most remarkable survival stories in the history of aviation. The crash was the first combat mission ever for the B-52.

 On 17 January 1966, a fatal collision occurred between a B-52G (58‑0256) from 68th Bombardment Wing out of Seymour Johnson AFB and a KC-135 Stratotanker (61-0273) over Palomares, Almería, Spain, killing all four on the tanker and three of the seven on the B-52G. The two unexploded B-28 FI 1.45-megaton-range nuclear bombs on the B-52 were eventually recovered; the conventional explosives of two more bombs detonated on impact, with serious dispersion of both plutonium and uranium, but without triggering a nuclear explosion. After the crash,  of contaminated soil was sent to the United States. In 2006, an agreement was made between the United States and Spain to investigate and clean the pollution still remaining as a result of the accident.
 On 24 June 1994, B-52H Czar 52, 61–0026 crashed at Fairchild AFB, Washington, during practice for an airshow. All four crew members died in the accident.
All six crew members were killed (five standard crew members and a flight surgeon).

Aircraft on display

Specifications (B-52H)

Notable appearances in media

A B-52 carrying nuclear weapons was a key part of Stanley Kubrick's 1964 black comedy film Dr. Strangelove or: How I Learned to Stop Worrying and Love the Bomb. A 1960s hairstyle, the beehive, is also called a B-52 for its resemblance to the aircraft's distinctive nose. The popular band the B-52's was subsequently named after this hairstyle.

See also

Notes

References

Bibliography

 
 
 
 
 
 
 .
 
 
 .
 
 .
 Davis, Larry. B-52 Stratofortress in action. Carrollton, Texas: Squadron/Signal Publications, 1992. .
 
 
 
 
 
 
 
 
 
 
 
 .
 
 
 
 
  
 
 
 
 
 
 
 
 
 
 
 
 
 Mehuron, Tamar A., Assoc. Editor. "2007 USAF Almanac – Equipment." Air Force Magazine: Journal of the Air Force Association, Volume 90, Number 5, May 2007. ISSN 0730-6784.
 .
  
 
 
 
 
 
 
 .
 
 
 
 
 
 
 
 Winchester, Jim, ed. "Boeing B-52 Stratofortress (SAC)". Military Aircraft of the Cold War (The Aviation Factfile). London: Grange Books plc, 2006. .
 Kai Wah G Eng, "Loss of 53–0393, First Production B-52B". "Buff Bulletin – Newsletter of the B-52 Stratofortress Association", Vol. 19, No. 1, Issue 67, Spring 2011, pg. 10.

External links

USAF B-52 Fact Sheet
B-52 Stratofortress history on fas.org
B-52 profile on AerospaceWeb.org
B-52 Stratofortress Association website
"Boeing B-52 – the Strategic Stratofortress" a 1957 Flight article by Bill Gunston

 

 
B-52 Stratofortress
Eight-engined jet aircraft
B-52 Stratofortress
Aircraft first flown in 1952
Strategic bombers